René Magritte Museum is a museum in Jette, a municipality in Brussels, Belgium, devoted to the Belgian surrealist painter René Magritte. The museum is located at 135, /, in the house where Magritte lived and worked for 24 years, between 1930 and 1954.

The ground floor of the house there is an apartment where Magritte and his wife Georgette lived, whereas the first and the second floors display the biographical exposition.

Magritte and his wife moved in 1954 to a bigger apartment in Schaerbeek, which, as they thought, was in better agreement with their social status. The testament of Magritte's wife, however, indicated that the house in Jette is the most important for the biography of Magritte. In 1993, André Garitte, an art collector and a fan of Belgian surrealism, bought the house, restored it, and in 1998, celebrating 100 years of Magritte, the museum was open to the public. In 2009, the museum reopened after an extensive restoration.

See also
 List of single-artist museums

References

1998 establishments in Belgium
Museums established in 1998
Museums in Brussels
Magritte, Rene
Historic house museums in Belgium
Jette
Magritte